Ullensaker is a municipality in Akershus in Viken county, Norway. It is part of the traditional region of Romerike. The administrative centre of the municipality is the city of Jessheim. It has a population of 40,459 inhabitants. Norway's largest international airport Oslo Airport, Gardermoen, is located in Ullensaker.

Name
The municipality (originally the parish) is named after the old Ullensaker farm. The name is first recorded in 1300 as Ullinshof. 
The first element is the genitive case of the name Ullinn (a sideform of Ullr). The last element was originally hof which means "temple", but this was later (around 1500 AD) changed to aker meaning "acre" or "field".

Coat-of-arms

Ullensaker does not have an heraldic coat-of-arms properly granted. The municipality uses a non-heraldic badge that is from modern times. The logo was adopted on 8 November 1979, and it shows the god Ullr of Norse mythology holding a bow and three arrows. The colors on the logo can vary.

Geography
Ullensaker borders with Eidsvoll to the north, Nes to the east, Sørum to the south, and Gjerdrum and Nannestad to the west.
The international airport that serves as the main airport of Norway, Oslo Airport, Gardermoen, is located in Ullensaker. The municipality has two major population centres: the village of Kløfta and the city of Jessheim, the latter one houses the administration center of Ullensaker. There is also a Royal Norwegian Army base at Sessvollmoen as well as a Royal Norwegian Air Force air station, Gardermoen Air Station.

Society
Ullensaker has had a huge population increase over the past fifty years. This increase has been slightly accelerating over the past few years. From 2000 to 2007, the population of Ullensaker increased by almost 6,000 people. The recent increase is partly attributed to the founding of Oslo Airport, Gardermoen.

History
Raknehaugen, the largest burial mound in the Nordic countries, has been carbon dated to around 550; the age of the mound is disputed.

Demographics

In 2021, 1,390 inhabitants had Polish parents and/or were Polish (themselves); 1,048 had Pakistani parents and/or were Pakistani.

Attractions
 Raknehaugen - the largest tumulus of Northern Europe
 Trandumskogen - A memorial honoring 173 Norwegians, 15 Soviet citizens and 6 Britons that were executed by the nazis during World War II.
 Gardermoen Culture Park - An area close to Gardermoen Airport, which serves as the Norwegian Air Force's airplane collection and the Scandinavian Airlines Museum's location.

Notable people 

 Niels Laache (1831 in Ullensaker –  1892) a Norwegian revivalist, writer, and bishop
 Kristian Laake (1875 in Ullensaker - 1950) Former Commanding General of Norway
 Gudmund Sundby (1878 in Ullensaker – 1973) a hydroelectric engineer and academic
 Thor Gystad (born 1919 in Ullensaker - 2007) politician, Mayor of Ullensaker 1959 to 1969
 Harald Espelund (born 1948) organic farmer and Mayor of Ullensaker from 2003 to 2015
 Laila Brenden (born 1956) a Norwegian author, lives in Jessheim
 Knut Ljøgodt (born 1968 in Ullensaker) a Norwegian art historian
 Anniken Huitfeldt (born 1969) a historian and politician, grew up in Jessheim
 Tanya Hansen (born 1973 in Jessheim) a Norwegian pornographic actress
 Thomas Enger (born 1973) a writer and journalist, grew up in Jessheim
 Mani Hussaini (born 1987) a Kurdish-Norwegian politician, lived in Jessheim since 2001

Musicians & Bands 
 Johannes Hanssen (1874 in Ullensaker – 1967) a bandmaster, composer and teacher
 Stein Ove Berg (1948 in Kløfta – 2002) a Norwegian singer and songwriter 
 Stian Tomt Thoresen (born 1976 in Jessheim) stage name Shagrath, vocalist and founder of Dimmu Borgir
 Ivar Tristan Lundsten  (born 1976 in Jessheim) stage name Brynjard Tristan, bassist and songwriter
 Tom Rune Andersen (born 1976 in Jessheim) stage name Galder, a guitarist and vocalist
 Andres Rafael Diaz (born 1976 in Jessheim) stage name Diaz, rapper 
 Antestor (formed 1990 in Jessheim) an unblack metal band
 Dimmu Borgir (formed 1993 in Jessheim) a symphonic black metal band

Sport 
 Oscar Fonbæk (1887 in Ullensaker – 1965) long-distance runner, bronze and silver medallist at the 1908 Summer Olympics
 Ole Kristian Furuseth (born 1967) a retired Norwegian alpine skier, skied for Ullensaker SK
 brothers Thomas Roth (born 1991 in Sand) & Andreas Roth (born 1993 in Sand) Norwegian middle-distance runners

Sister cities
The following cities are twinned with Ullensaker:
  - Borgarbyggð, Western Region, Iceland
  - Falkenberg, Halland County, Sweden
  - Leirvík, Eysturoy, Faroe Islands
  - Odsherred, Region Sjælland, Denmark

References

External links

Municipal fact sheet from Statistics Norway

Ullensaker municipality website
Gardermoen culturepark 

 
Municipalities of Akershus
Municipalities of Viken (county)